Richard Postell (died 1400) was a Canon of Windsor from 1373 to 1400 and Dean of Wolverhampton.

Career

He was appointed:
Rector of Bradfield 1361
Rector of Harlington 1365
Rector of Nerberth (diocese of St David's) 1372
Dean of Wolverhampton 1373 - 1394

He was appointed to the tenth stall in St George's Chapel, Windsor Castle in 1373 and held the canonry until 1400.

Notes 

1400 deaths
Canons of Windsor
Deans of Wolverhampton
Year of birth unknown